Mitch Rivett (born 11 September 1989), is an Australian professional rugby league footballer who has played in the 2010s.

References

External links
Brisbane Broncos profile
Redcliffe Dolphins profile

1989 births
Australian rugby league players
Brisbane Broncos players
Redcliffe Dolphins players
Rugby league centres
Rugby league wingers
Rugby league fullbacks
Living people
Rugby league players from Brisbane